Studies in Slavic and General Linguistics (SSGL) is an academic book series that was founded in 1980 by A.A. Barentsen, B.M. Groen and R. Sprenger and is published by Rodopi.

SSGL is mainly devoted to the field of descriptive linguistics. Although SSGL is primarily intended to be a means of publication for linguists from the Low Countries, the editors are pleased to accept contributions by linguists from abroad. SSGL appears at irregular intervals, but the editors aim at bringing out on the average one volume a year.

Editors
Egbert Fortuin
Peter Houtzagers
Janneke Kalsbeek

Editorial Advisory Board
R. Alexander (Berkeley), A.A. Barentsen (Amsterdam), B. Comrie (Leipzig), B.M. Groen (Baarn), F.H.H. Kortlandt (Leiden), W. Lehfeldt (Göttingen), J, Schaeken (Leiden), G. Spieß (Cottbus), W.R. Vermeer (Leiden).

Volumes
Volumes include:

 # 41. Innovation in Tradition: Tönnies Fonne’s Russian-German Phrasebook. (Pskov, 1607). By Pepijn Hendriks.  E-
 # 40. Dutch Contributions to the Fifteenth International Congress of Slavists. Minsk.August 20–27, 2013. Linguistics. Edited by Egbert Fortuin, Peter Houtzagers, Janneke Kalsbeek and Simeon Dekker.  E-
 #39. Selected Writings on Slavic and General Linguistics. By Frederik Kortlandt.  E-
 #38. Language Contact in Times of Globalization. Edited by Cornelius Hasselblatt, Peter Houtzagers and Remco van Pareren.  E-
 #37. Accent Matters. Papers on Balto-Slavic accentology. Edited by Tijmen Pronk and Rick Derksen.  E-
 #36. The Slovene Dialect of Egg and Potschach in the Gailtal, Austria.By Tijmen Pronk. 
 #35. Stressing the past. Papers on Baltic and Slavic accentology. Edited by Thomas Olander and Jenny Helena Larsson. 
 #34. Dutch Contributions to the Fourteenth International Congress of Slavists. Ohrid, September 10–16, 2008. Linguistics. Edited by Peter Houtzagers, Janneke Kalsbeek and Jos Schaeken. 
 #33. Evidence and Counter-Evidence. Essays in Honour of Frederik Kortlandt. Volume 2: General Linguistics. Edited by Alexander Lubotsky, Jos Schaeken and Jeroen Wiedenhof. With the assistance of Rick Derksen and Sjoerd Siebenga. 
 #32. Evidence and Counter-Evidence. Essays in Honour of Frederik Kortlandt. Volume 1: Balto-Slavic and Indo-European Linguistics. Edited by Alexander Lubotsky, Jos Schaeken and Jeroen Wiedenhof. With the assistance of Rick Derksen and Sjoerd Siebenga. 
 #31. Nicolaas van Wijk, (1880-1941). Slavist, linguist, philanthropist. By Jan Paul Hinrichs. 
 #30. Dutch Contributions to the Thirteenth International Congress of Slavists. Ljubljana, August 15–21, 2003. Linguistics. Edited by Jos Schaeken, Peter Houtzagers and Janneke Kalsbeek. 
 #29. Govor derevni Ostrovcy Pskovskoj oblasti, by Zep Honselaar. 
 #28. Languages in Contact, Edited by Dicky Gilbers, John Nerbonne and Jos Schaeken.

See also
Slavistics

External links
 Studies in Slavic and General Linguistics on the publishers website
 Department of Russian Studies & Slavic Languages and Cultures at Leiden University

Slavic studies
Academic works about linguistics
Publications established in 1980
Rodopi (publisher) books